Victor Löfstedt (born October 16, 1986) is a Swedish professional ice hockey player. He is currently playing with Kristianstads IK in the Swedish Hockeyettan.

He made his debut with Frölunda HC during the 2013 European Trophy.

References

External links

1986 births
IK Oskarshamn players
Karlskrona HK players
Kristianstads IK players
Living people
Olofströms IK players
Swedish ice hockey right wingers